The Tamaulipas shiner (Notropis braytoni) is a small North American freshwater fish, living in the  Rio Grande 
drainage in Texas and northern Mexico.

References 

 

Tamaulipas
Freshwater fish of Mexico
Freshwater fish of the United States
Fish of the Eastern United States
Endemic fauna of Texas
Natural history of Tamaulipas
Fish described in 1896
Taxa named by David Starr Jordan